Jiefangbei CBD, also known as Jiefangbei Business Walking Street, is the ultra-dense, urbanized downtown core and one of several central business districts of Chongqing, China. It is anchored by a large pedestrian mall with a landmark monument tower (its namesake, "Jiefangbei") and surrounded by collections of tall skyscrapers.

Overview
The area surrounding the Jiefangbei monument tower makes up the main central business district of the Yuzhong District of Chongqing and is one of the most prominent CBDs in the interior Western China. Thousands of shops, bars, and restaurants are located in Jiefangbei CBD including numerous large international department stores, upscale designer boutiques, local street food stalls, movie theaters, bars, and dance clubs; all clustered in pedestrian only streets surrounding the Jiefangbei monument and pedestrian square.

The Jiefangbei pedestrian square itself is lined with numerous giant mega-shopping malls with jumbotron LED screens and illuminated advertising billboards located alongside the city's tallest commercial skyscrapers, world class international hotels, and luxurious residential accommodations. According to Women's Wear Daily, in 2013, Jiefangbei Square was popular with "young, stylish people to meet and shop at stores like Cartier, Ermenegildo Zegna, Louis Vuitton, Gucci and Rolex." Chongqing Haochi Jie, which is a popular food street is not far away from Jiefangbei and is a popular destination among locals and tourists.

History
Jiefangbei Shopping Square was completed in 1997.

Geography
Jiefangbei consists of a large pedestrian square surrounding the -tall People's Liberation Monument (celebrating China's victory in World War II). The   shopping square is flanked by a large number of large multinational department stores, streetfront luxury boutiques, and upscale restaurants, as well as commercial supertall skyscrapers. There are podiums offering additional retail options both streetside and underground.

Jiefangbei is the heart of Chongqing city. It is located immediately uphill from the Chaotianmen Port; which itself is at the confluence of the Jialing and Yangtze Rivers.

Attractions

 Changjiang (Yangtze River) Ropeway
 Chaotianmen Square
 Chaotianmen Passenger Ferry night light show
 HongYaDong Shopping Complex
 Jiefangbei (People's Liberation, WWII) Monument and Clock
 Jiefangbei Food Street
 People's Park

Department stores

 Pacific Department Store 
 Wangfujing Department Store
 Carrefour
 Maison Mode Times
 Diwang Square 
 Chongqing Times Square

Towers

 Chongqing Financial Street
 Chongqing International Trade Center (ITC: A, B)
 Chongqing Poly Tower (
 Chongqing Tall Tower (International Finance Center))
 Chongqing World Financial Center (WFCC)
 Chongqing World Trade Center (WTCC)
 Intercontinental Hotel Chongqing
 International Commercial Center (ICC)
 Metropolitan Tower
 New York New York
 United International Mansion
 Westin Hotel
 Xinhua International Tower
 Yingli Tower

Public transit
Being the prominent CBD for the city, Jiefangbei is well served by public transportation. Chongqing Rail Transit (CRT) has three metro subway lines crossing the CBD and there are numerous municipal bus routes to other parts of the city. Taxis and shuttle buses are readily available to hail streetside or at hotel taxi stands throughout the central business district.

Subway information
CRT Line 1
 Jiaochangkou Station 
 Xiaoshizi Station
 Chaotianmen Station (terminus)
CRT Line 2
 Linjiangmen Station
 Jiaochangkou Station (terminus)
CRT Line 6
 Xiaoshizi Station

See also
Jiangbeizui CBD
List of leading shopping streets and districts by city

References

External links
 

Yuzhong District
Economy of Chongqing
Geography of Chongqing
Tourist attractions in Chongqing
Shopping districts and streets in China
Pedestrian malls in China
Financial districts in China
Central business districts in China